The 1915 South Dakota State Jackrabbits football team was an American football team that represented South Dakota State University as an independent during the 1915 college football season. In its fourth season under head coach Harry W. Ewing, the team compiled a 5–1–1 record and outscored opponents by a total of 163 to 7.

Schedule

References

South Dakota State
South Dakota State Jackrabbits football seasons
South Dakota State Jackrabbits football